Tunnel Creek National Park is a national park in the Kimberley region of Western Australia,  northeast of Perth and  east of Broome. The natural cave through which  Tunnel Creek flows is a major attraction of the park.

Many Aboriginal rock paintings and speleothems are present in the cave decorating the walls. The cave was the hideout of the Aboriginal warrior, Jandamarra who was killed outside the entrance of the cave in 1897. It is part of the  Balili (Devonian Reef) Conservation Park.

Geography
The range is composed of limestone and is the remains of a Devonian reef system formed around 350 million years ago.

The tunnel component of Tunnel Creek has a length of approximately  that runs underground and it one of the oldest cave systems in Western Australia. The reef was first exposed around 250 million years ago and the first cave systems began to form, the present cave systems were created about 20 million years ago.

The creek was once known as "The Cave of the Bats" with at least five species of bat inhabiting the cavern. There are large pools of water on the floor of the cave in which freshwater crocodiles have been found. The pools indicate that the water table is only just below the present floor surface and water only flows through the area after heavy rainfall.

References

See also 
 Protected areas of Western Australia

National parks of Western Australia
Kimberley (Western Australia)
Protected areas established in 1992